Novial was created as an international auxiliary language by Danish linguist Otto Jespersen, who introduced it to the world in 1928. Jespersen had previously been a co-author of Ido, which started to take form around 1907.  Both languages base their vocabularies primarily on prominent Germanic and Romance languages, but differ grammatically in several important respects. Novial is more analytic in its grammar than Ido, and, in Jespersen's view, more natural. 

Comparisons among Ido, Novial, and other notable international auxiliary languages have formed an important part of interlinguistic studies. For example, both Ido and Novial were among the languages investigated by the International Auxiliary Language Association (IALA), which developed Interlingua.

Alphabets and pronunciation

Both Ido and Novial are written using the modern Latin alphabet (a.k.a. the English alphabet), with no diacritics. 

In the Phonetic Novial spelling system (1928, 1930) the main differences between the Novial vocabulary and those of other systems come from the suppression of the letters c and z. The letter s plays an important part but tends to distort the visual appearance of some words (sientie = science, sesa = cease, sivil(i) = civil).

Personal pronouns

Verbal systems

The grammars of Novial and Ido differ substantially in the way that the various tenses, moods and voices of verbs are expressed. Both use a combination of auxiliary verbs and verb endings. However, Novial uses many more auxiliary verbs and few endings, while Ido uses only one auxiliary verb and a greater number of verb endings.

As with most international auxiliary languages, all verb forms in Ido and Novial are independent of person (1st, 2nd or 3rd persons) and number (singular or plural).

Language sample for comparison
Here is the Lord's Prayer in both languages:

See also

Comparison between Ido and Interlingua
Comparison between Novial and Esperanto 
Comparison between Ido and Esperanto
Comparison between Esperanto and Interlingua
Ido
Novial

References

External links 

 Kompleta Gramatiko di la Linguo Internaciona Ido (187-page PDF file.)
  An International Language: Otto Jespersen's 1928 book which introduced Novial. Contains discussion of earlier auxiliary languages including Ido.
 An International Language: The Delegation. Ido Chapter of the first book about Novial which discusses Ido (specific criticisms of Ido are mentioned in various chapters of the book).
 OTTO JESPERSEN His Work for an International Auxiliary Language By Henry Jacob, 1943, Comparative Texts comparing Ido, Novial, Occidental, Latino sine flexione, Esperanto and English.
  A PLANNED AUXILIARY LANGUAGE By Henry Jacob, 1947. A detailed comparative study of interlinguistics with full grammatical details of five systems of demonstrated usefulness, Esperanto, Ido, Occidental, Novial, and Latino sine flexione.
 About Direct Derivation in International Languages By Friedrich Auerbach, 1930 (in Novial).
   A passage from Machievelli in Ido and Novial
   Contains many links pertinent to Novial, Ido, and Otto Jespersen
 Comparison between Ido and Novial at Conlang Atlas of Language Structures.

Ido language
Novial
International auxiliary languages
Comparison of constructed international auxiliary languages